Kristen Millares Young is a Cuban-American investigative journalist, essayist, and novelist. Subduction, her first novel, was released in 2020.

Biography 
Young graduated magna cum laude from Harvard University with an A.B. in History and Literature of Latin America, citations in Latin American Studies and Spanish in 2003. In 2010, Young served as a multimedia reporting fellow at the University of California, Berkeley. She went on to earn her master of fine arts in creative writing and was a GO-MAP Fellow at the University of Washington from 2010–2012. She was the Prose Writer-in-Residence at Hugo House in Seattle, Washington from 2018-19.

Career 
Young started out as a general assignment reporter intern for Time magazine, the Buenos Aires Herald, and the Miami Herald. For four years, she served as a business reporter and later political beat reporter for the Seattle Post-Intelligencer. She is the cofounder and board chair of InvestigateWest, a nonprofit newsroom.

While at The New York Times, Young contributed to "Snow Fall: The Avalanche at Tunnel Creek", which won the 2013 Pulitzer Prize in Feature Writing and a Peabody Award.

Young has also written freelance articles for publications including The Washington Post and the Guardian. She also teaches creative writing in English and Spanish at Hugo House, the Port Townsend Writers' Conference and the Seattle Public Library.

Writings

Journalism 
As an investigative journalist, Young specializes in reporting on topics such as the environment, missing and murdered indigenous women (MMIW), automation, education and social justice, gay rights, government malfeasance and corruption, climate change, worker's rights, and more.

Essays 

 "Every woman keeps a flame against the wind." (Proximity, November 2018), anthologized in Latina Outsiders: Remaking Latina Identity (Routledge, June 2019)
 "Follow Me" (City Arts Magazine, September 2018)
 "When a rideshare trip leads to fear and disgust" (Crosscut, January 2018)
 "On Being Driven" (Moss, October 2017)
 "Straight, No Chaser" anthologized in Pie & Whiskey (Sasquatch, October 2017)
 "A few thoughts while shaving" (Hobart, July 2017)

Subduction 
Her debut novel, Subduction, was published by Red Hen Press in April 2020. It was reviewed in The Washington Post and selected as a staff pick by The Paris Review.

Awards 

Young earned the following awards as contributing researcher for the New York Times team that produced Snow Fall: The Avalanche at Tunnel Creek

 American Society of Newspaper Editors (Punch Sulzberger Award for Online Storytelling, 2013)
 Pictures of the Year International (Best E-Project), 2013

Other awards

Society of American Business Editors and Writers (Best in Business, General Excellence, 2007)
Society of Professional Journalists' Pacific Northwest Chapter (Second Place for Comprehensive Coverage, 2007) and (First Place for Best Government Reporting, 2006, with Ruth Teichroeb; Best Online Business Adaption, 2006)

References

University of Washington alumni
Harvard College alumni
Living people
Writers from Washington (state)
American fiction writers
Hispanic and Latino American novelists
American women novelists
21st-century American novelists
21st-century American journalists
Novelists from Washington (state)
American women essayists
American newspaper writers
American people of Cuban descent
Year of birth missing (living people)
21st-century American women writers